The Maryland Eastern Shore Hawks baseball team, also known as the Eastern Shore Hawks, is the varsity intercollegiate athletic team of the University of Maryland Eastern Shore in Princess Anne, Maryland, United States. The team competes in the National Collegiate Athletic Association's Division I and is a member of the Northeast Conference (NEC). Through the 2022 season, the Hawks had competed in the school's full-time home of the Mid-Eastern Athletic Conference (MEAC), but after that season, the MEAC merged its baseball league into that of the NEC. Eastern Shore and the three other MEAC members that sponsored baseball became NEC associate members in that sport.

Head coaches

References

External links
 Official website